The women's shot put event at the 2005 Asian Athletics Championships was held in Incheon, South Korea on September 1.

Results

References
Results

2005 Asian Athletics Championships
Shot put at the Asian Athletics Championships
2005 in women's athletics